Vinuesa is a Spanish surname. Notable people with the surname include.
Alfonso de Vinuesa (1958–1997), Spanish racing driver
Antonio Palomares Vinuesa (1930–2007), Spanish politician
Carola Garcia de Vinuesa (born 1969), Spanish-Australian medical doctor
Juan Vinuesa, Argentine chess player
Ricardo Vinuesa (born 1986), Spanish-Swedish physicist

Spanish-language surnames